Vitaliy Ihorovych Mykytyn (born 4 November 1998) is a Ukrainian football player.

Club career
He made his Ukrainian Premier League debut for FC Veres Rivne on 29 April 2018 in a game against FC Zorya Luhansk.

References

External links
 

1998 births
Living people
Ukrainian footballers
Ukraine youth international footballers
Association football forwards
NK Veres Rivne players
FC Lviv players
Ukrainian Premier League players
Ukrainian Second League players